Regina Aprijaskis (1921 – 2013) was a French artist established in Peru. She was known primarily for her pictorial production centered in geometrical abstraction.

Biography

Infancy and youth 
Aprijaskis was born in Burdeos (France) in the year of 1921. At five, she moved with her parents to the city of Lima (Peru) where she stayed until she was ten. In 1931, her family decided to return to Bulgaria. There, she studied at a school run by French monks for two and a half years until, due to the Europe's worsening political situation and the Nazi regime, the family decided to return to Peru.

In Lima, she continued her studies at the Castaneda Sisters school, but left that school to continue her training in the Autonomous Upper National School of Fine Arts of Peru, where she was then directed by José Sabogal.

Training 
Aprijaskis studied plastic arts in the School of Fine Arts of Lima, where she had remarkable indigenous painters as mentors. Her first years were marked by the teachings of Camilo Blas, with whom she started learning the foundations of figurative painting; José Sabogal, with whom she started to work with nude paintings; and she formed a profound friendship with Julia Codesido.

In the 1950s, she travelled to New York where she grew fond of the work of Mark Rothko and Barnett Newman. In the 1960s, she received training in the abstract expressionist painter Theodoros Stamos's workshop. The influence of this stay in the United States, which lasted almost 18 years, was decisive for the change of direction in her work about geometrical abstraction.

Work

The Paracas series 
In 1968, she had her first individual exhibition at the Institute of Contemporary Art of Lima, where she showed the pictorial Paracas series. The works in this show would be the basis of her later paintings. The show was chosen by Peruvian art critic Juan Acha for its vanguard and rationalist efforts.

To quote the Peruvian critic Jorge Villacorta, "the work of Aprijaskis constitutes one of the few solid proposals of geometric abstraction or on the base of constructivist principles that have developed  in the panorama of Peru's visual arts."

References 

2013 deaths
1921 births
French women artists
20th-century French painters
French expatriates in Bulgaria
French expatriates in the United States
French expatriates in Peru